Grigore Socolescu (7 August 1905 - 1995) was a Romanian bobsledder. He competed in the four-man event at the 1928 Winter Olympics.

References

1905 births
1995 deaths
Romanian male bobsledders
Olympic bobsledders of Romania
Bobsledders at the 1928 Winter Olympics
Place of birth missing